Kaashmora ( Deadly spirit) is a 2016 Indian Tamil-language horror masala film written and directed by Gokul. It features Karthi in dual roles for the second time after Siruthai as the protagonist and antagonist respectively alongside Nayanthara, and Sri Divya. The film features soundtrack composed by Santhosh Narayanan, cinematography handled by Om Prakash and edited by V. J. Sabu Joseph.

Kaashmora was released worldwide on 28 October 2016, coinciding with the Diwali festival.

Plot
Kaashmora and his family are con artists who cheat people in the name of black magic and dark spirits. One day, a PhD research student named Yamini joins Kaashmora, only to gather evidence and expose him to the public. Kaashmora's fame brings him to a superstitious and fraudulent minister. Kaashmora earns the minister's trust. When the income tax department raids the minister's house, the minister asks his henchmen to transfer all of the illegal money to Kaashmora's house. Seeing this as an opportunity to escape and settle abroad, Kaashmora's family escapes with the money. Meanwhile, Chelapathy Rao seeks Kaashmora's help and brings him to a haunted bungalow in the outskirts of Tamil Nadu and Andhra Pradesh. In the bungalow, Kaashmora is haunted by actual ghosts.

Back in Chennai, the minister learns that Kaashmora is a fraudster and sends his henchmen to kill his family. The henchmen try to get Kaashmora from the bungalow but are unable to do so as the ghost beats them all and drags Kaashmora and his family inside the bungalow. Inside, they meet a broker who got trapped inside the bungalow for a long time. The broker says that the bungalow was once a princess's palace. Ever since her death, residents and owners of the bungalow had met with an ill-fate. He also tells that there are 13 ghosts in the bungalow. The trapped people meet the ghost of Raj Nayak, the head of all 12 ghosts. Raj Nayak asks Kaashmora to help him, and his subordinates reach the spiritual world. He then locks them in the castle. That night, a young girl in Kaashmora's dream leads him to a locked door within the castle.

Waking up, Kaashmora follows the same route, but is stopped by Yamini, who reveals to him that Chelapathy Rao, the man who led him here, died 75 years ago, and it was his ghost that led Kaashmora, as well as Yamini, to the bungalow. Kaashmora searches the castle and gets hold of an old book that dates back 700 years. Raj Nayak was a self-obsessed warlord and a womanizer. The king remained silent and did not interfere with Raj Nayak's growing atrocities because of his military prowess. One day, Princess Rathna Mahadevi elopes with her lover, who is the enemy kingdom's prince. The king announces that he will marry off Rathna and give away half of his kingdom to the man who finds her. Raj Nayak kills the prince and forcibly brings Rathna back. He demands to be wed to the princess and wants the other half of the kingdom as dowry. When opposed, he kills the crown prince and the king. Raj Nayak then marries Rathna and crowns himself King. However, Rathna has other plans. She and her friends seduce Raj Nayak and his subordinates. While Raj Nayak's subordinates are burned alive, Raj Nayak is beheaded by Rathna. However, he kills her before dying. Before breathing her last breath, Rathna places a curse on the 13 men, preventing them from reaching the spiritual world.

Since then, Raj Nayak and the other 12 ghosts had haunted the palace and its occupants. An exorcist once had predicted that Raj Nayak and the other ghosts would reach eternal power if they are able to sacrifice the lives of five people belonging to the same family with the same birth star (Rohini). The sacrifice should be performed by a lady who is the only woman in her generation. This should happen during the Navakaali Pournami that occurs once every millennium. Kaashmora recollects that his family members all have the same birth sign and that Yamini is the only woman in her family.

That night, Navakaali Pournami occurs, and Raj Nayak forces Kaashmora and his family to a guillotine. The young girl from Kaashmora's dream appears, and turns out to be Rathna's reincarnation. While Rathna and Raj Nayak fight each other, Kaashmora fends off the subordinate ghosts with the help of a magical sword. Rathna's conscience leads him to a chamber within the castle where Raj Nayak's remains are. Using the sword, Kaashmora destroys the remains, making Raj Nayak vulnerable. Rathna destroys Raj Nayak's spirit, and it goes to the underworld. The other spirits flee the castle to the spiritual world. Kaashmora and his family get out of the castle, and he claims that he has destroyed the spirits and cleansed the centuries-haunted bungalow. Kaashmora's family tells the politician that the money stolen from the politician has been kept by the ghost.

Cast
 Karthi as Kaashmora and Raj Nayak (Dual Role)
 Nayanthara as Rathna Mahadevi
 Sri Divya as Yamini
 Vivek as Kaashmora's father
 Sharath Lohitashwa as Minister
 Madhusudhan Rao as Swamy
 Pattimandram Raja as Yamini's father
 Saravana Subbiah as show host
 Muruganandam as a property broker
 Jangiri Madhumitha as Amala, Kaashmora's sister
 Siddharth Vipin as Yamini's groom
 Raju Sundaram special appearance in the song "Dhikku Dhikku Sir"
 Mukthar Khan as King
 Ajay Ghosh as Priest

Production
Production was begun in the first week of May 2015. Karthi plays two roles: a king (Raj Nayak), a youth (Kaashmora). Nayanthara plays a princess and Sri Divya as a research student, and Vivek was cast as Karthi's father. Karthi learnt horseriding in preparation for the film.

The music for the movie was composed by Santhosh Narayanan. Other crew includes the art director Rajeevan, editor V J Sabu Joseph, and cinematographer Om Prakash. The film was marketed as a mix of action and comedy.

Visual effects
It's been said that the "3D Face scan" technology has been used in this film. Karthi's face has been 3D scanned for an important sequence which will be running 15 minutes. Kaashmora comprises 80 minutes of VFX scenes. Director Gokul says that, 360-degree omnidirectional camera rig is used for shooting a particular sequence and this is the first time for an Indian movie to use this technology. This technology covers entire 360 degree, approximately entire sphere. Omnidirectional cameras are used where large visual field coverage is needed, such as in panoramic photography. This camera is used in this movie to shoot a song and few scenes. Art direction team has erected 17 sets in and around Chennai to make simultaneous filming process and to save time.

Soundtrack

The soundtrack album is composed by Santhosh Narayanan, collaborating with Karthi for the second time after Madras (2014). The audio rights were purchased by Think Music. The album featuring six tracks, features lyrics written by Lalithanand and Muthamil in the original Tamil version. The soundtrack album was launched on 7 October 2016, in Chennai, along with the theatrical trailer of the film, was released.

The Tamil version of the soundtrack album received positive reviews. Indiaglitz rated the album 3.5 out of 5 stars, stating that "The entire album has a tinge of echo to it, the depth of which lands the right notes for a supernatural score. With two karaoke tracks thrown into the kitty, Kashmora is a delightful album. It needs no introduction that Santhosh Narayanan is a musical genius; we have seen this right from his debut, to the recently blockbuster success, Kabali. Adding one more feather to his hat, Sathosh has struck the chord, yet again, as being one-of-a-kind." The Times of India rated the album 3 out of 5, and stated that "This one's not a usual Santhosh fest, but works in some parts!" Behindwoods rated the album 2.75 out of 5, summarised it as "Kaashmora has the magical spell, the experimental tint, and the typical Santhosh Narayanan flavor."

Release
Kaashmora was released worldwide on 28 October 2016 with Thenandal Films bought the distribution rights. The satellite rights of the film were sold to Jaya TV. Digital rights of the film were bought by Amazon Prime Video.

Box office
The film collected  in Tamil Nadu in first day.The film collected more than  worldwide in two days. Total ₹90.16 crore World Wide

References

External links 
 

2010s Tamil-language films
2016 films
Films about con artists
Films scored by Santhosh Narayanan
High fantasy films
Indian action comedy films
Indian action horror films
Indian comedy horror films
Indian epic films
Indian fantasy action films
2010s masala films
2016 action comedy films
2016 comedy horror films
2010s fantasy action films